The Ministry of Health (MoH) is a federal government ministry of Ethiopia, responsible for public health concerns. Its head office is on Sudan Street in Addis Ababa. Until 2020, Amir Aman is the director. Lia Tadesse has been the head of the ministry since 2020. The organization is a cabinet level organization which has authority over the Public Health Institute.

History
The Ministry of Public Health was created in 1948 followed by Proclamation issued in 1946. The Public Health Administration shortly transferred to the Ministry of Public Health. 

In recent years, the ministry promotes family planning programs introduced contraceptives, giving women a choice over their sexual and reproductive health while combatting child marriage and harmful practice in Ethiopia.

Former directors
 Tedros Adhanom (2005 to 2012)
 Amir Aman (director of the ministry beginning in 2019)

References

External links
 Ministry of Health
 Ministry of Health (Amharic)

Ethiopia
Government of Ethiopia
Government ministries of Ethiopia